Albert Edward "Ben" Sandford (14 November 1877 – 26 June 1942) was an Australian rules footballer who played for the St Kilda Football Club in the Victorian Football League (VFL).

References

External links 

1877 births
1942 deaths
Australian rules footballers from Victoria (Australia)
St Kilda Football Club players